) is a studio album by Nigerian highlife musician Chief Stephen Osita Osadebe released in 1996. Recorded in one day during his first American tour, Kedu America contains new recordings of some of Osadebe's previous songs, including "" and "".

Reception 

 received generally positive reviews from critics.  Bob Tarte of AllMusic gave the album 4.5 stars, stating that the album "offers bounty beyond expectation".  Robert Christgau described the album as a "delight" and in a further retrospective review as a "mood album [...] set on giving you a good time".

Drew Wheeler ranked the album 4th in Billboard's 1996 Critics' Poll.

Track listing

Personnel 
Credits adapted from the liner notes.

Musicians 

 Chief Stephen Osita Osadebe – lead vocals
 John Odagwe – bass guitar
 Ezikel Uti – lead guitar
 Fidelis Mazua – rhythm guitar
 Dede Uzoma – drums
 Chukwodozi Obi – Igbo congas
 Christian Ibekwe - trumpet
 Stephen Udechukwu – trombone, backing vocals
 Joseph Ugokwe – tenor saxophone, backing vocals
 Willie "Pepper" Chijoke – claves, backing vocals
 Obi Osadebe – backing vocals

Production 

 Paul Avgerinos – recording engineer
 Jack "That Dog'll Hunt" Burke – engineer
 John Nelson – engineer
 Ross Nyberg – mastering
 Adam Traum – photography

Further reading

References 

1996 albums
Highlife albums by Nigerian artists